The 2017–18 Magyar Kupa, known as  for sponsorship reasons, was the 60th edition of the tournament.

Schedule
The rounds of the 2017–18 competition are scheduled as follows:

Matches 
A total of 42 matches will take place, starting with First round on 30 August 2017 and culminating with the Final on 1 April 2018 at the László Papp Budapest Sports Arena in Budapest.

Round I
The first round ties are scheduled for 30 August – 21 September 2017.

|-
!colspan="3" style="background:#ccccff;"| 30 August

|-
!colspan="3" style="background:#ccccff;"| 5 September

|-
!colspan="3" style="background:#ccccff;"| 6 September

|-
!colspan="3" style="background:#ccccff;"| 13 September

|-
!colspan="3" style="background:#ccccff;"| 19 September

|-
!colspan="3" style="background:#ccccff;"| 20 September

|-
!colspan="3" style="background:#ccccff;"| 21 September

|}

Round II
The second round ties are scheduled for 29 September – 4 October 2017.

|-
!colspan="3" style="background:#ccccff;"| 29 September

|-
!colspan="3" style="background:#ccccff;"| 3 October

|-
!colspan="3" style="background:#ccccff;"| 4 October

|}

Round III
The third round ties are scheduled for 25 October – 10 November 2017.

|-
!colspan="3" style="background:#ccccff;"| 25 October

|-
!colspan="3" style="background:#ccccff;"| 7 November

|-
!colspan="3" style="background:#ccccff;"| 8 November

|-
!colspan="3" style="background:#ccccff;"| 10 November

|}

Round IV
The fourth round ties are scheduled for 17–20 January 2018.

|-
!colspan="3" style="background:#ccccff;"| 17 January

|-
!colspan="3" style="background:#ccccff;"| 20 January

|}

Round V
The fifth round ties are scheduled for 7–8 February 2018.

|-
!colspan="3" style="background:#ccccff;"| 7 February

|-
!colspan="3" style="background:#ccccff;"| 8 February

|}

Final four
The final four will be held on 31 March – 1 April 2018 at the László Papp Budapest Sports Arena in Budapest.

Awards
Most valuable player: 
Best Goalkeeper:

Semi-finals

Bronze medal match

Final

Final standings

See also
 2017–18 Nemzeti Bajnokság I
 2017–18 Nemzeti Bajnokság I/B
 2017–18 Nemzeti Bajnokság II

References

External links
 Hungarian Handball Federaration
 handball.hu

Magyar Kupa Women